The 1982 All-Ireland Minor Football Championship was the 51st staging of the All-Ireland Minor Football Championship, the Gaelic Athletic Association's premier inter-county Gaelic football tournament for boys under the age of 18.

Cork entered the championship as defending champions, however, they were defeated by Kerry in the Munster final.

On 19 September 1982, Dublin won the championship following a 1-11 to 1-5 defeat of Kerry in the All-Ireland final. This was their ninth All-Ireland title overall and their first in three championship seasons.

Results

Connacht Minor Football Championship

Quarter-Final

Semi-finals

Final

Leinster Minor Football Championship

Preliminary Round

Quarter-Finals

Semi-Finals

Final

Ulster Minor Football Championship

Preliminary Round

Quarter-Finals

Semi-Finals

Final

Munster Minor Football Championship

Quarter-Final

Semi-Final

Final

All-Ireland Minor Football Championship

Semi-Finals

Final

References

1982
All-Ireland Minor Football Championship